Warren-Prescott School is  a Boston public school located in Charlestown, Massachusetts with a zip code of 02129. Warren-Prescott School is  a K–8 school, but was an elementary school before 2004.

History 
This school is named after two historical figures from the American Revolution. Dr. Joseph Warren fought and died at the Battle of Bunker Hill in 1775, a few hundred yards from the school. William Prescott was the commander of the colonial forces at the Battle of Bunker Hill.

On April 21, 1840, the first Warren School was dedicated in  Charlestown, Massachusetts near Bunker and Breed's Hills.  The current school occupies the former site of the Warren School.  On December 15, 1857 the Prescott School was dedicated, located on a portion of the Bunker Hill Burying Ground which is currently the site of Charlestown High School. The Warren and Prescott schools later merged to form the Warren-Prescott School.

Curriculum 
The Warren-Prescott School follows the curriculum set by the Boston Public Schools.  The school's students' test scores are competitive with other nearby Boston Public Schools, such as the Eliot School and the Josiah Quincy School.

Programs and after-school activities 
These activities are available to students after school hours. The kind of activities the students can participate in is sports, such as basketball, football, kickball, baseball, soccer and more. There is also dance practice, performing arts, visual art and crafts, how to write music and play instruments and singing practice.

Notable alumni
James E. Hayes, Supreme Knight of the Knights of Columbus

References

External links 
 Warren-Prescott School Homepage
 Massachusetts Department of Education Page
 Warren-Prescott SchoolDigger Page
 Warren-Prescott School's Resource Page
 Warren-Prescott School's Review Page

Public elementary schools in Massachusetts
Public middle schools in Massachusetts
1840 establishments in Massachusetts